Amor P. Deloso (born September 3, 1938) is a Filipino politician who served as the governor of Zambales, starting as the Officer-in-Charge from 1986 until 1987, Governor from 1988 until 1998, 2007 until 2010, and from 2016 until 2019. He is the former member of Liberal Party. Deloso is the member of Partido Galing at Puso in 2016, and he is currently as the member of MAKIMAZA.

EO Number 1
On June 30, 2016, the newly elected governor of the Province of Zambales issued Executive Order Number 1, ordering all mining companies to stop operation. This came after the Supreme Court of the Philippines issued Writ of Kalikasan against five large-scale mining companies.

References

Governors of Zambales
People from Zambales
Liberal Party (Philippines) politicians
Living people
1938 births